The 2013 Florida A&M Rattlers football team represented Florida A&M University in the 2013 NCAA Division I FCS football season. The Rattlers were led by new head coach Earl Holmes and played their home games at Bragg Memorial Stadium. They were a member of the Mid-Eastern Athletic Conference.

In addition to a new head coach, Florida A&M entered the season with a new offensive and defensive coordinator. Levon Kirkland came aboard as the new defensive coordinator, while Quinn Gray returned for his second season as quarterback coach and his first season as offensive coordinator. George Small also returned to the team as the Assistant Head Coach after failing to get the head coaching job at Southern University.

The Rattlers entered the 2013 season having been picked to finish fifth in the MEAC and having placed 11-players on the All-MEAC Pre-Season team.

They finished the season 3–9, 2–6 in MEAC play to finish in tenth place.

Schedule

References

Florida AandM
Florida A&M Rattlers football seasons
Florida AandM Rattlers football